Kefalos (Κέφαλος) is the westernmost town on the Greek island of Kos, 43 km from Kos Town. It is situated on a peninsula, also known as Kefalos, at the south-west side of the island. The town is built on a stone height, dominated by the imposing windmill of Papavasilis and is home to 2,156 inhabitants (2011 census).

Neighbouring settlements, administration and facilities
Beneath the old town of Kefalos is the Bay of Kamari, where the beach resorts of Kamari, Kampos and Onia follow the curve of the bay for approximately 2 kilometres. The name Kefalos is often used for this area as well.

Kefalos town and these smaller beach settlements form together a local community (δημοτική κοινότητα), also called Kefalos (population 2011: 2,638), which is part of the municipal unit of Irakleides and of the Kos municipality.

There are several facilities for visitors (taverns, bars, music, boat trips), but shops are limited; for other than daily purchases, people can go to either the neighbouring Kardamaina or to Kos Town on the other end of the island.

Attractions
the ruins of a medieval castle
the ancient site of Palatia
the basilica of Ayios Stefanos at nearby Kamari
the cave at Aspri Petra
the Monastery of Ayios Ioannis (Thimianos)
Mikro Limanaki beach at the north of Kefalos peninsula.

External links

Kefalos Holiday Reviews

Kos
Populated places in Kos (regional unit)